"The Touch" is a rock song by American singer and guitarist Stan Bush. The song features prominently in the 1986 animated film The Transformers: The Movie, and appears on the soundtrack album released that year.

History
"The Touch" was released as a double A-side single with "Weird Al" Yankovic's "Dare to Be Stupid", another song from the soundtrack album of the Transformers movie. The power ballad was also released in 1987 on Stan Bush & Barrage's self-titled album. The song was inspired by a line in the movie Iron Eagle, and originally written for the Sylvester Stallone film Cobra. Its inclusion on the Transformers soundtrack was Bush's first exposure to the franchise.  ‘The Touch’ was also featured in The Transformers animated series 1987 episode ‘The Return of Optimus Prime, Part 2’, when the newly resurrected Optimus Prime unleashed the power of the Autobot Matrix of Leadership to vanquish the Hate Plague. The song is briefly used in the 2018 film Bumblebee in a scene where the title character plays it to encourage Charlie, serving as an in-joke for viewers familiar with the song's history in the franchise.

In 1997, Bush re-recorded the song and "Dare" (another song from The Transformers: The Movie) for the BotCon exclusive soundtrack CD Til All Are One. Bush submitted a different re-recorded version of the song from his album In This Life for the 2007 live action Transformers film, but it was not included on the final soundtrack. He later recorded another version, subtitled "Sam's Theme", for possible inclusion in the 2009 sequel Revenge of the Fallen. The 2009 version differs markedly from the original and 2007 versions, adding rap verses and being more melancholic in tone, with it being described as a "redux a la Linkin Park". In 2010, Bush released a music video for "The Touch: Sam's Theme" on his YouTube channel, featuring clips from the first two Transformers films. The song was edited with the rap verses removed, and was included in the 2010 album Dream the Dream.

The 2007 version of "The Touch" was released as a free downloadable track for the video game Guitar Hero World Tour on May 28, 2009. 
Bush had expressed interest in wanting the song to appear in the game or in competing music game Rock Band. On October 12, 2010, the song was released as a downloadable track for Rock Band through the Rock Band Network.

On September 15, 2012, Bush released another remix of the song as "The Touch (Power Mix)" on iTunes. The "Power Mix" is a variation of "Sam's Theme" with a new chorus arrangement. Also included in the single is "The Touch (Epic Guitar Mix)", which, like the 1997 and 2007 versions, is a re-recording of the original song.

In popular culture
Outside of Transformers, its most prominent use was in the 1997 film Boogie Nights, performed badly by Mark Wahlberg's character. His cover also appeared as a hidden track on the first volume of that film's soundtrack album. Director Paul Thomas Anderson had also used the song in his 1988 short film The Dirk Diggler Story, on which Boogie Nights is based. Boogie Nights depicts Wahlberg's character performing the song in 1983, even though in reality, the song was not released until 1986.

The song also appeared on a 2008 episode of Chuck entitled "Chuck Versus Tom Sawyer", as well as a 2010 episode of American Dad! entitled "Cops and Roger", during an 80s-film style montage. The song also plays during The Goldbergs episode "Dance Party USA," when Barry Goldberg practices dance with Coach Miller to be on Dance Party USA. The song was also parodied in the episode "Burgerboss" of Bob's Burgers, and appeared in the 2013 Regular Show episode "A Bunch of Full Grown Geese," the 100th episode of the series. The Transformers Prime episode "Nemesis Prime" also featured an instrumental version of the song being played on the radio of special agent William Fowler's car, just before being attacked by the titular character of the episode. American wrestler Jimmy Jacobs also used the song as his theme music in his early days in the Ring of Honor promotion, as did Mike Quackenbush up until 2001, while the 2009 version was used as the theme for Chikara's 2011 King of Trios event. The 2007 version was used by CM Punk as part of a mock tribute video to then-interim Raw General Manager John Laurinaitis.

In video games, the song plays during the final mission of Saints Row IV when the President acquires the power armor, with dialogue homaging its first use in The Transformers: The Movie during Optimus Prime's final battle with Megatron. It is also playable any time using the in-game radio. The song also plays during the prologue cutscene of Shadow Warrior and its sequel Shadow Warrior 2. Trailers for Transformers: Fall of Cybertron and the game's end credits prominently featured both the 2007 version and 2012 Power Mix remix of the song.

References

1986 songs
Transformers music
American rock songs
Hard rock ballads
1980s ballads
Scotti Brothers Records singles